Silvija is a Croatian, Latvian and Lithuanian and Serbian 
feminine given name. The associated name day is March 10.

Notable people named Silvija
Silvija Erdelji (born 1979), Serbian table tennis player
Silvija Latožaitė (born 1993), Lithuanian cyclist
Silvija Mrakovčić (born 1968), Croatian long jumper and triple-jumper
Silvija Popović (born 1986), Serbian volleyball player
Silvija Šimfa (born 1954), Latvian politician
Silvija Talaja (born 1978), Croatian tennis player

References 

Latvian feminine given names
Lithuanian feminine given names
Feminine given names
Serbian feminine given names